Israel is scheduled to compete at the 2024 Summer Olympics in Paris from 26 July to 11 August 2024. It will be the nation's eighteenth appearance at the Summer Olympics, except for Moscow 1980 as part of the United States-led boycott.

Competitors
The following is the list of number of competitors in the Games.

Athletics

Israeli track and field athletes achieved the entry standards for Paris 2024, either by passing the direct qualifying mark (or time for track and road races) or by world ranking, in the following events (a maximum of 3 athletes each):

Track and road events

Gymnastics

Rhythmic
Israel entered a squad of rhythmic gymnasts to compete in the group all-around competition, following the nation's successful runner-up at the 2022 World Championships in Sofia, Bulgaria.

See also
Israel at the Olympics
Israel at the 2024 Summer Paralympics

References

Olympics
2024
Nations at the 2024 Summer Olympics